is the art of using pressed flowers and other botanical materials to create an entire picture from these natural elements. 
Such pressed flower art consists of drying flower petals and leaves in a flower press to flatten them, exclude light and press out moisture. These elements are then used to "paint" an artistic composition. The origin of this art form has been traced to 16th century Japan, but it is now practiced worldwide.

Historical background
As early as the 16th century, samurai were said to have created  as one of their disciplines to promote patience, harmony with nature and powers of concentration. Similarly, as botanists in Europe began systematic collection and preservation of specimens, art forms with the pressed plant materials developed, particularly during the Victorian era.

The art form became popular in the Holy Land in the late 1890s and into the 20th century when elaborate souvenir books combining photographs of the holy sites and the pressed flowers gathered at these sites. These photographs and pressed, dried flowers were artistically formatted and bound between olive wood covers to be sold to visitors. American actress Grace Kelly, during her years as Princess Grace of Monaco, practiced oshibana and helped promote the art of pressed flowers worldwide, employing pressed botanical materials sent to her from abroad. My Book of Flowers, published in 1980, includes chapters on her art.

Outside of Asia
Outside of Asia, the art gained popularity in Britain during the Victorian era and experienced a revival from the 1970s to the early 2000s. Some artists outside of Asia have continued to use it.

Pressing flowers makes them appear flat, and there is often a change in color, ranging from faded colors to a greater intensity of vibrant colors. The pressed flowers and leaves can be used in a variety of craft projects. They are often mounted on special paper, such as handmade paper, Ingres paper, Japanese paper, or paper decorated by marbling. Each leaf and flower is glued onto a precise location. With a creative approach to the use of materials, a leaf becomes a tree and petals form mountains.

Washes of watercolor painting are sometimes applied to the backing paper before the pressed material is attached. Pressed material may also be mounted on fabrics, such as velvet, silk, linen or cotton.

Petals and leaves can be applied to wood furnishings using the technique of decoupage.

Emerging methods 
 artists are employing various new technologies in pressing methods, framing techniques and color enhancing to help the pressed materials keep their beauty through the years. Nobuo Sugino, pioneering figure in contemporary , and his father used dessicant papers to press flowers, helping hold color. A method of vacuum-sealing frames to lock in color, texture and clarity of the petals and leaves and help prevent moisture and fungi intrusion was also developed in Japan and is now practiced by many  artists worldwide.

International organizations

International Pressed Flower Art Society
The IPFAS in an international pressed flower organization that promotes pressed flower art and offers education and holds competitions. It has members from over 20 nations including Japan, the United Kingdom, United States, France, Germany, Mexico, and Australia. It was founded in 1999 by Nobuo Sugino, a Japanese pressed flower artist and President of Japan Wonderful  Club.

Pressed Flower Craft Guild
In the UK, the Pressed Flower Craft Guild was established in 1983 by Joyce Fenton (a pressed flower artist) and Bill Edwardes (who devised the method of framing pressed flower pictures adopted by the guild). It claims to have an international membership.

Worldwide Pressed Flower Guild (WWPFG)
The WWPFG was established in July 2001. In November 2008, the guild was incorporated in North Carolina as a public educational non-profit organisation.

Others
Among them include:
 Philadelphia Flower Show, organized by the Pennsylvania Horticultural Society, host of the annual /pressed flower art competition.
  Art, a Japanese pressed flower organization and school founded by Mirian Tatsumi in 1996 in São Paulo, Brazil

See also 
 Illustration
 Graphic design
 Gold dipped roses
 Herbarium, a scientific plant collection, usually of pressed plants

References

Further reading
Burkhart, W. Eugene, Jr. Pressed Flower Art: Tips, Tools, and Techniques for Learning the Craft. Mechanicsburg, PA: Stackpole Books, 2008.
Oshibana, by Natalia Kishigami. 2013.

External links
IPFAS
Adults can also make flower pressing as a hobby

Flowers in culture
Japanese art
Japanese words and phrases
Plants in art